Clydesdale Bank plc is a retail and commercial bank in the United Kingdom. It was formed in Glasgow, Scotland in 1838, and is the only former Scottish bank which retains its UK headquarters in Scotland, following the implosions in 2008 of the Bank of Scotland and of the Royal Bank of Scotland.

With its immense and international growth in commercial and industrial clients, including Sir Robert McAlpine & Sons, and their extensive credit requirements it sought investment by a larger consortium. Consequently it was purchased by Midland Bank, the largest bank in the world at this stage,  in 1920. Much later the Clydesdale became part of the National Australia Bank Group (NAB),  between 1987 and 2016. Clydesdale Bank was divested from National Australia Bank in early 2016 and its holding company CYBG plc, to be renamed as Virgin Money UK plc, trading on the London and Sydney stock exchanges. In June 2018, it was announced that Clydesdale Bank's holding company CYBG would acquire Virgin Money for £1.7 billion in an all-stock deal, and that the Clydesdale and Yorkshire Bank public brands would be phased out in favour of retaining Virgin's brand. CYBG plc's banking businesses, Clydesdale Bank, Yorkshire Bank, Virgin Money and B, currently operate as trading divisions of Clydesdale Bank plc under its banking licence.

The public marketing name 'Virgin Money' is used by all the operating divisions of the Clydesdale and Yorkshire Bank Group Plc whose headquarters are at 177 Bothwell Street, Glasgow. It is the UK 's sixth largest bank.

As with two other banks of Scottish origin, namely the Bank of Scotland and the Royal Bank of Scotland, the Clydesdale Bank retains the right to issue its own banknotes.

History

Establishment 

In March 1838, an advertisement appeared for a new joint stock banking company in Glasgow, the Clydesdale Banking Company. It was to be "chiefly a local bank – having few branches – but correspondents everywhere" though it was conceded that a branch in Edinburgh would be necessary. The Bank duly opened for business in both cities in May 1838. Checkland described the Bank as the creation of "a group of Glasgow businessmen of middling order, liberal radicals…who were active in the government and charities of the city."

The driving figure behind the formation of the bank was James Lumsden, a stationer by business, a councillor, police commissioner and, later, Lord Provost of Glasgow. Another member of the founding committee, Henry Brock, became the Bank's first manager. Brock came of a merchant family, was an accountant and one of the founders of the Glasgow Savings Bank. Despite the declaration in the advertisement, in the year after formation the Bank opened three Glasgow branches as well as its first country branches in Campbeltown and Falkirk; a further seven had been opened by 1844. These were supplemented by the acquisition of the Greenock Union Bank; formed in 1840, it had four branches in the Glasgow hinterland.

Expansion

Following the purchase of the Greenock Union, there was little change in the structure of the Bank and there were still only 13 branches in 1857. In that year, Clydesdale became the first Scottish bank to produce a printed balance sheet, and it showed assets of £2.7 million and net profits of £70,000. The public disclosure of its strength stood it in good stead, for only months later the Western Bank of Scotland closed its doors, followed the next day by the first closure of the City of Glasgow Bank. Clydesdale gained not only customers but 13 branches from the Western. A few months later came the acquisition of the Edinburgh and Glasgow Bank, which had been weakened by the same economic disturbances. The Edinburgh & Leith Bank, as it was originally, had been formed in 1838 "for the benefit of the 'industrious middle classes'" and it had bought the Dumfries-based Southern Bank of Scotland in 1842 and the Glasgow Joint Stock Bank in 1844, the latter leading to the change of name to Edinburgh & Glasgow Bank. Poor lending in the 1845–47 period, particularly to Australia, dogged the Bank for the next ten years and it was eventually taken over by the Clydesdale for a nil consideration; Clydesdale retained 19 of its 27 offices. Five years later, in 1863, Clydesdale acquired the more successful Eastern Bank of Scotland, like Clydesdale, also founded in 1838. Based in Dundee it was to have two separate offices and boards, one in Dundee, the other Edinburgh. Before opening for business it acquired the Dundee Commercial Bank to serve as its Dundee office. Difficulties with the two boards working together led to the Edinburgh bank being wound up and the Eastern became an essentially Dundee bank; its acquisition gave Clydesdale its first interests north of the River Tay.

Much of the growth in the Bank's network had come from acquisitions and the management remained cautious regarding direct branch expansion. However, in 1865, a committee was formed to look at prospects and 16 branches were opened in two years. In 1874 the Clydesdale went south of the border and opened three branches in Cumberland but this was seen as following existing trade rather than making a specific attempt to enter the English market. Indeed, Clydesdale was one of the last Scottish banks to acquire a London office (1877). In 1878, the City of Glasgow Bank failed for the second time, leading again to an increase in Clydesdale's deposits and the acquisition of nine of the Glasgow branches. The scale of the collapse led to further debate on the desirability of limited liability and, following legislation in 1879 (allowing fixed uncalled liability on shares), Clydesdale Bank registered as a limited liability company in 1882.

Reid described the period 1890–1914 as "the tranquil years", but that did not preclude steady expansion of the branch network – from 92 to 153. That was to mark the end of Clydesdale's independent existence.

The Midland Era
In 1917 the bank was approached by London City and Midland (later Midland Bank) and, although initially resisted, Clydesdale Bank was sold in 1920. However, it continued to operate independently and was always referred to as an affiliate, not a subsidiary. The Glasgow banks suffered more than others in the depressed economy of the inter-war period and from being the largest lender in Scotland in 1920, it fell to fifth place by 1939. Despite this, the Bank continued to open branches, particularly in areas enjoying export growth, and the network increased from 158 in 1919 to 205 in 1939.

Midland had also acquired the North of Scotland Bank in 1923 but the Aberdeen management had fiercely resisted any attempt to merge with Clydesdale. However, the changed competitive market after the Second World War meant that the two banks could not remain separate and in 1950 they were amalgamated to become the Clydesdale and North of Scotland Bank (soon shortened to Clydesdale Bank). Clydesdale had 189 branches and the North of Scotland 161, covering 221 towns between them. Of the eight Scottish banks, Clydesdale had been the third-largest by deposits, the North being the smallest. The merged bank became Scotland's largest in terms of deposits, advances and branches. However, by 1969, mergers elsewhere had reduced the number of Scottish banks to three with Clydesdale now being the smallest. Midland needed to rationalise the enlarged Clydesdale but faced resistance. Midland also needed additional capital and its solution to both challenges was to sell Clydesdale (along with Midland's Irish subsidiaries) to National Australia Bank in 1987.

National Australia Bank Group

In 1989 National Australia Bank bought the Clydesdale bank for £420 million. Fred Goodwin, an accountant working for Touche Ross, worked on the acquisition. In 1995 Goodwin, with little direct banking experience, was appointed deputy CEO of the Clydesdale until 1997. During this period Goodwin earned the nickname "Fred the shred" for his aggressive manner in dealing with staff.

In September 2013 the bank was fined £8.9 million after miscalculating the mortgage repayments of more than 42,000 customers.

In March 2015 the House of Commons Treasury Select Committee said in a conduct report that they had evidence that the Clydesdale Bank had mis-sold unregulated tailored business loans and that the bank's own internal review of the mis-selling had serious shortcomings and lacked transparency.

In April 2015 the Clydesdale was fined £20.7 million the largest of its type imposed by the Financial Conduct Authority for the mis-selling of PPI insurance.

CYBG plc

National Australia Bank confirmed in October 2014 that it planned to exit the UK, and was considering a number of options for Yorkshire and Clydesdale Banks, including a possible stock market listing. In October 2015, NAB confirmed it would float Clydesdale Bank and Yorkshire Bank on the London Stock Exchange (LSE) in February 2016 through an initial public offering, with an aim of raising £2 billion. The bank's newly formed holding company CYBG plc began conditional trading on the LSE and the Australian Securities Exchange on 3 February, and began trading unconditionally from 8 February.
The flotation share price of 180p meant that the National Australia Bank made an estimated loss of £2 billion on the sale and had to make provisions of around £1.7 billion to cover claims for mis-selling of products.

In March 2016 CYBG announced the closure of 28 branches as a cost saving move. The following month, CYBG announced the closure of a further 9 Clydesdale branches and 17 Yorkshire Bank branches.

Virgin Money
In June 2018, CYBG plc announced it would acquire Virgin Money for £1.7 billion in an all-stock deal. Almost one in six employees are expected to lose their jobs in the takeover, which will result in retail customers being migrated to the Virgin Money brand over three years. The acquisition of Virgin Money was completed on 15 October 2018. In June 2019, CYBG plc announced its plans to consolidate its businesses under the Virgin Money brand. Clydesdale Bank, Yorkshire Bank and B, which exist as trading divisions of Clydesdale Bank plc will begin to use the Virgin Money name in late 2019 with full use planned by early 2021. In preparation for rebranding, the existing Virgin Money plc was merged into the existing Clydesdale Bank plc on 21 October 2019.

See also

References

External links
 

Banks of Scotland
Companies based in Glasgow
Clydesdale
Banks established in 1838
Scottish brands
1838 establishments in Scotland
 
National Australia Bank